The  U-1 was a 1950s liquid hydrogen trailer designed to carry cryogenic liquid hydrogen (LH2) on roads being pulled by a powered vehicle. It was designed in response to requirements of the secret US government program code-named Suntan, which aimed to develop a high speed, high altitude hydrogen-powered military aircraft. The trailer was constructed by the Cambridge Corporation and had a capacity of 26,500 liters with a hydrogen loss rate of approximately 2 percent per day.

The very low density of hydrogen made tandem axles on the semi-trailer unnecessary, so the U-1 had only one. During subsequent use of this equipment, there occurred an endless series of problems, all stemming from the single axle, which was unheard of for such a large trailer. It seems that each time one of these large semi-trailers went through a state weighing station, it roused suspicion, doubt about the equipment, and inquiries about the nature of the load.

Because of these difficulties, the specifications for its successor the U-2 was a double axle semi-trailer which was not needed for the load, but which raised no questions on the road.

See also
Hydrogen economy
Hydrogen infrastructure
Timeline of hydrogen technologies

References

Trailers
Hydrogen technologies